Lucas Mendes may refer to:

 Lucas Mendes (American soccer) (born 1997), American soccer player
 Lucas Mendes (footballer, born 1990), Brazilian footballer
 Lucas Pereira Mendes (born 1991), Brazilian footballer
 Lucas Mendes (footballer, born 1992), Brazilian footballer
 Lucas Mendes (journalist) (born 1944), Brazilian journalist